William Joseph "Billy" Garrett (April 24, 1933 in Princeton, Illinois – February 15, 1999 in Glendale, California) was an American racecar driver.

A second generation driver (his father, John, competed in roadsters and sprint cars in California), Billy Garrett began his career racing roadsters and midgets in Southern California, and was the 1955 & 1956 URA midget champion. He made 18 starts in USAC Championship races from 1956 through 1958, winning the pole position at Langhorne Speedway in 1956. He suffered career ending injuries in a crash during the 1958 Rex Mays 100 at the Wisconsin State Fair Speedway. Garrett was inducted into the National Midget Auto Racing Hall of Fame.

Indy 500 results

World Championship career summary
The Indianapolis 500 was part of the FIA World Championship from 1950 through 1960. Drivers competing at Indy during those years were credited with World Championship points and participation. Billy Garrett participated in 2 World Championship races. He started on the pole 0 times, won 0 races, set 0 fastest laps, and finished on the podium 0 times. He accumulated a total of 0 championship points.

References

1933 births
1999 deaths
Indianapolis 500 drivers
People from Princeton, Illinois
Racing drivers from Illinois